Malijan-e Bala (also Romanized as Malījān-e Bālā) is a village in Howmeh Rural District, in the Central District of Garmsar County, Semnan Province, Iran. At the 2006 census, its population was 298, in 88 families.

References 

Populated places in Garmsar County